The APA Award for Lifetime Contributions to Psychology is the highest award of the American Psychological Association.

List of recipients
Source: APA

 1990 B.F. Skinner
 1991 Neal E. Miller
 1993 Herb Simon, Roger Sperry
 1994 Kenneth B. Clark, Anne Anastasi
 1996 Paul Meehl
 1997 Carolyn R. Payton
 2000 Raymond D. Fowler
 2001 Janet Taylor Spence
 2002 Richard C. Atkinson
 2003 George Armitage Miller
 2004 Albert Bandura
 2005 Judith Rodin
 2006 E. Mavis Hetherington
 2007 Daniel Kahneman
 2008 Edward F. Zigler
 2009 Patrick H. DeLeon, Alan E. Kazdin
 2010 Shelley E. Taylor
 2011 Florence Denmark
 2012 Kelly D. Brownell, Rena R. Wing
 2013 Antonette M. Zeiss
 2014 Beverly Daniel Tatum
 2015 Jonathan Kellerman
 2016 Eduardo Salas
 2017 Martin E.P. Seligman
 2018 Margaret Beale Spencer
 2019 Derald Wing Sue
 2020 Melba J. T. Vasquez
 2021 Geoffrey M. Reed, Jessica Henderson Daniel
 2022 William E. Cross, Jr.

See also

 List of psychology awards

References

American psychology awards
American Psychological Association